Dane Sweeny (born 12 February 2001) is an Australian professional tennis player. Sweeny made his ATP Tour debut at the 2021 Great Ocean Road Open after receiving a wild card into the main draw.
He has a career high ATP singles ranking of No. 247 achieved on 3 October 2022 and a doubles ranking of No. 165 achieved on 3 October 2022.

Personal life
In August 2015, Sweeny represented Australia at the ITF World Junior Tennis Finals in Prostejov, Czech Republic.

Career

2018–2020: Career Beginnings
Sweeny made his ITF Men's World Tennis Tour main draw debut in Mornington, Victoria in March 2018 and his ATP Challenger Tour main draw debut in October 2019 in Traralgon.

2021: ATP debut
In January 2021, Sweeny made the third and final round of the 2021 Australian Open – Men's singles qualifying. Sweeny was awarded a wild card into the 2021 Great Ocean Road Open, where he made his ATP tour main draw debut. Sweeny defeated Nam Ji-sung in the first round before losing to Aljaz Bedene in round two.

In August and September, Sweeny played in the ITF circuit in Monastir, reaching the semi-final in one. On 27 September 2021, Sweeny achieved a career high singles ranking of 533. He broke into the world's top 500 on 15 November 2021. Sweeny ended 2021 with a singles ranking of 496.

2022: Grand Slam doubles and Top 250 singles debut
Sweeny reached the second round of the 2022 Australian Open – Men's singles qualifying. He made his debut in doubles as a wildcard pair partnering compatriot Li Tu reaching the third round where they lost to second seeds Rajeev Ram/Joe Salisbury.

In February 2022, Sweeny won his first ITF titles in singles and doubles in Canberra.

He made his top 250 debut on 3 October 2022 at world No. 247.

Performance timelines

Only main-draw results in ATP Tour, Grand Slam tournaments, Davis Cup and Olympic Games are included in win–loss records.

Singles
Current after the 2022 Australian Open

Challenger and World Tennis Tour finals

Singles: 8 (6-2)

Doubles: 8 (5–3)

References

External links
 
 
 Dane Sweeny at Tennis Australia

2001 births
Living people
Australian male tennis players
Tennis people from Queensland
Sportspeople from the Sunshine Coast
Tennis players from Sydney
21st-century Australian people